Bloody Mary, in comics, may refer to:
 Bloody Mary (DC Comics), a DC Comics character and member of the Female Furies
 Bloody Mary (Helix), two series for DC imprint Helix by Garth Ennis and Carlos Ezquerra
 Bloody Mary (Marvel Comics), an alias of the Marvel Comics character better known as Typhoid Mary

See also
 Bloody Mary (disambiguation)